Play is the first live album by English post-punk/new wave band Magazine. It was released in December 1980 by Virgin Records (International) and in April 1981 by I.R.S. Records (US). It peaked at No. 69 on the UK Album Chart. It was Magazine's sixth 1980 release.

Content 
The live album consisted of a recording of the group's performance at Melbourne Festival Hall in Australia on 6 September 1980. The performance was part of a world tour in support of the group's third studio album, The Correct Use of Soap, released earlier that year. The majority of the album is composed of songs from the first and third studio albums. The original album is notable for including a performance of the B-side "Twenty Years Ago", while omitting the group's best-known song, "Shot by Both Sides", which was cut from the original album release along with gig opener "Feed the Enemy".

Personnel 
The short-lived line-up of Magazine that performed Play had formed due to the departure of founding member and guitarist John McGeoch. In his place was ex-Ultravox guitarist Robin Simon. Simon left the group on completion of the tour and was in turn replaced by Ben Mandelson for Magazine's fourth studio album. Simon's recording history with the group is limited to Play and tracks from another Australian gig on the 2009 compilation Live and Intermittent. The rest of the group consisted of Howard Devoto (vocals), Barry Adamson (bass and backing vocals), Dave Formula (keyboards) and John Doyle (drums).

Production 
The album was produced by Magazine and John Brand. Design was credited to Malcolm Garrett with photography by Birrer.

Release 
The album was originally released as an LP and cassette in December 1980. The album was subsequently released as a budget album on LP, cassette and CD in the late 1980s. A Japanese edition of the album was released in 1995 with three bonus live tracks recorded at the Russell Club in Manchester on 3 May 1980, which had been released as B-sides to "Sweetheart Contract". A remastered edition, titled Play+, was released by Virgin/EMI in 2009, augmented by the two deleted songs from the Melbourne Festival Hall gig and a bonus disc featuring a 21 July 1978 performance at Manchester Lesser Free Trade Hall. The 1978 gig featured the Real Life lineup of the group with McGeoch and original drummer Martin Jackson.

Reception 
Play received mixed reviews, mainly due to the absence of "Shot by Both Sides".

Track listing

Play (Original release)

Play+ (2009 re-release)

Personnel

Magazine
 Howard Devoto – vocals
 Barry Adamson – bass guitar
 Dave Formula – keyboards
 John Doyle – drums
 Robin Simon – guitar
 John McGeoch – guitar (Play+ disc two)
 Martin Jackson – drums (Play+ disc two)

Production
 Magazine - producer
 John Brand - producer, engineer 
 Paul Frindle - assistant engineer 
 Pete Mew - mixing (Play+ disc two)
 Malfunctions - Stage
 Birrer - Photography
 Malcolm Garrett (at Assorted Images) - Sleeve

Chart positions

References

1980 live albums
Magazine (band) albums
Virgin Records live albums
Live post-punk albums